Michael Robert Herman (6 November 1942 – 2 November 2000) was a French American mathematician. He was one of the leading experts on the theory of dynamical systems.

Born in New York City, he was educated in France. He was a student at École polytechnique before being one of the first members of the Centre de Mathématiques created there by Laurent Schwartz. In 1976 he earned his PhD at the Paris-Sud 11 University, under supervision of Harold Rosenberg. He introduced Herman rings in 1979.

Herman received the Salem Prize in 1976. He was an Invited Speaker of the International Congress of Mathematicians (ICM) in 1978 in Helsinki and the ICM in 1998 in Berlin. Among his students was Jean-Christophe Yoccoz, 1994 Fields Medalist.

References

1942 births
2000 deaths
Scientists from New York City
French people of American descent
20th-century French mathematicians
University of Paris alumni
Dynamical systems theorists
Members of the French Academy of Sciences
École Polytechnique alumni